Journey to the Center of the Earth is an action game for the Nintendo DS and the nintendo 3ds based on the 2008 movie of the same name, and was developed by Hungarian studio Human Soft and published by THQ.

Journey to the Center of the Earth will allow the player to play as the three main characters of the movie: Trevor, Sean and Hannah as they journey to and through the center of the earth. In the game the player will navigate their way through the center of the Earth in an attempt to escape.

Gameplay 

The gameplay of the game is based solely on the events of the movie in an open world environment, allowing the player to control out-of-control mine carts, and rafts throughout the center of the Earth. THQ also expanded the environment of the center of the Earth to allow the player to further journey throughout the open environment. The game also features three playable characters: Trevor, Sean and Hannah, who each have a special ability. Progress in the game is based on the use of checkpoints. Each time a character dies, they return to the last checkpoint and continue from there. Journey to the Center of the Earth allows the player to control movements with the bottom screen while the character reacts on the upper screen. IGN said this about the game: "Horrible controls make the game an endless pattern of accidentally jumping into bottomless pits."

Reception 

IGN simply noted that "it's [the game] freaking terrible, and there's not even a console version to go play instead." IGN mainly criticized the game because there was only a version to play for the Nintendo DS and not on another platform. IGN also criticized the recordings of the game, saying that "The voice acting and sound effects for Center of the Earth are so horrendously bad that they literally made me LOL."

References 

2008 video games
Action video games
Works based on Journey to the Center of the Earth
Nintendo DS games
Nintendo DS-only games
Video games based on films
Video games based on adaptations
Video games based on works by Jules Verne
Video games developed in Hungary
Video games featuring female protagonists
Travel to the Earth's center